Naked Punch Review is a quarterly interdisciplinary review and magazine of philosophy, art, politics and poetry.

The magazine was founded in 2002 by a collective of young London-based thinkers called the PostAnalytic group, now dissolved. The founding editors were Qalandar Bux Memon, Lorenzo Marsili and Jacopo Moroni.

References

External links
Naked Punch Review

2002 establishments in the United Kingdom
Cultural magazines published in the United Kingdom
Magazines published in London
Magazines established in 2002
Marxist magazines
Philosophy magazines
Quarterly magazines published in the United Kingdom
Visual arts magazines published in the United Kingdom